Kim Yale (November 22, 1953 – March 7, 1997) was an American writer and editor of comic books for several publishers including DC Comics, Eclipse Comics, First Comics, Marvel Comics, and WaRP Graphics.

Biography
Yale was born in Evanston, Illinois, to the Reverend Richard A. Yale and Theresa Yale. Her father was a Navy chaplain which meant that for many years she and her family moved to various locations in the United States and elsewhere before resettling in Evanston during her teen years.  She earned a B.A. in English from Knox College.

Yale's first published comics work appeared in 1987 in the New America limited series, a spin-off of Timothy Truman's Scout series published by Eclipse Comics. She married fellow comics creator, and frequent collaborator, John Ostrander the same year. Yale and Ostrander developed the character of Barbara Gordon into Oracle, and wrote her origin in the short story "Oracle: Year One" published in The Batman Chronicles #5 (Summer 1996).

The two co-wrote Manhunter, a series which DC launched in the wake of the Millennium crossover. Their collaboration on Suicide Squad included the "Janus Directive" storyline in issues #27–30 and the creation of the character Dybbuk in issue #45 (Sept. 1990). Yale served as an editor for DC from 1991–1993 and oversaw licensed titles such as Advanced Dungeons and Dragons, Dragonlance, Forgotten Realms, Star Trek, and Star Trek: The Next Generation.

Friends of Lulu
Yale was heavily involved with the Friends of Lulu, an organization promoting women in comics that operated from 1994–2011. Yale served as a member of the board and Vice-President of the New York chapter. The Kimberly Yale Award for Best New Talent, an award given by the Friends of Lulu organization, was named in her honor.

Cancer
Yale wrote an ongoing column in the Comics Buyer's Guide, in which she detailed her battle against breast cancer. Following her diagnosis, the cancer spread to her abdomen and pelvis, a process she described in detail to the readers of the column. The cancer made it very difficult for her to write, and the origin story for Oracle included in The Batman Chronicles #5 (1996) was her last project. Yale died of breast cancer in 1997 at the age of 43.

Bibliography

As writer

DC Comics

 The Batman Chronicles #5 (1996)
 Comet #11 (1992)
 Deadshot #1–4 (1988–1989)
 Manhunter #1–24 (1988–1990)
 Suicide Squad #23–24, 27–32, 34, 36–37, 39–43, 45–66 (1989–1992)

Eclipse Comics
 New America #1–4 (1987–1988)
 Real War Stories #2 (1991)

First Comics
 The Gift: A First Publishing Holiday Special #1 (1990)
 Grimjack #44–45, 48, 53, 58–59, 61, 64, 66, 70–81 ("Munden's Bar" backup stories) (1988–1991)
 Munden's Bar Annual #2 (1991)

Marvel Comics
 Double Edge: Omega #1 (1995)
 Excalibur Annual #2 (1994)

WaRP Graphics
 ElfQuest: Kahvi #1–6 (1995–1996)
 ElfQuest: New Blood #9 (1993)

As editor

DC Comics

 Advanced Dungeons & Dragons #26–36 (1991)
 Avatar #2–3 (1991)
 Dragonlance #26–28, 33–34 (1991)
 Forgotten Realms #17–25 (1991)
 The Outlaws #1–8 (1991)
 Peter Cannon, Thunderbolt #6 (1992)
 Sgt. Rock vol. 2 #14–21 (1991–1992)
 Sgt. Rock Special #12–13 (1991)
 Star Trek #32–39, 41, 45 (1992–1993)
 Star Trek: The Next Generation #32–39, Annual #3 (1992)
 Zatanna #1–4 (1993)

References

External links
 
 Kim Yale at Mike's Amazing World of Comics

1953 births
1997 deaths
20th-century American women writers
American comics writers
Comic book editors
Deaths from breast cancer
Female comics writers
Writers from Evanston, Illinois
Place of death missing